Martensia albida is a species of red algae.

References

Species described in 2006
Delesseriaceae